Othello Zavaroni (29 March 1910 – 28 February 1991) was a French architect. His work was part of the architecture event in the art competition at the 1948 Summer Olympics.

References

1910 births
1991 deaths
20th-century French architects
Olympic competitors in art competitions
Architects from Paris